PCSO may refer to:

 Police community support officer, a police staff role in England and Wales
 Police custody and security officer, a police staff role in Scotland
 Pinellas County Sheriff's Office, a law enforcement agency in Florida
 Philippine Charity Sweepstakes Office, a government-controlled corporation for fundraising